Stadsbygd is a village in Indre Fosen municipality in Trøndelag county, Norway. The village is located at the southern end of the Fosen peninsula in a wide, flat valley, just east of the village of Askjem, along the north side of the Trondheimsfjord.

The village was the administrative centre of the old municipality of Stadsbygd that existed until 1964.  The main church for the village and surrounding area is Stadsbygd Church, located just south of the village of Stadsbygd.

Notable residents
 Nils Waltersen Aasen (1878–1925), Norwegian inventor
 Oddmund Raudberget (born 1932), artist, painter, and sculptor

References

Rissa, Norway
Indre Fosen
Villages in Trøndelag